Bai Sheng is a fictional character in Water Margin, one of the Four Great Classical Novels in Chinese literature. Nicknamed "Daylight Rat", he ranks 106th among the 108 Stars of Destiny and 70th among the 72 Earthly Fiends.

Background
Bai Sheng, who lives with his wife in Anle Village in Yuncheng prefecture, Shandong, is nicknamed "Daylight Rat" because he is a do-nothing who spends most of his time on gambling.

Robbing the birthday gifts
Bai Sheng once received help from Chao Gai, the headman of Dongxi Village in Yuncheng County. When Chao and his six confederates plan to seize valuables in transportation to Grand Tutor Cai Jing in the imperial capital Dongjing, Chao suggests using Bai's home as their base as it is not far from Yellow Mud Ridge, where they would stage the hijack. Wu Yong, the strategist of the gang, suggests roping Bai into their plan.

In fact, Bai Sheng assumes a central role as a fake wine seller. The plan is to beguile the escorts of the valuables to drink the drugged wine in one of his two buckets. Bai crosses the ridge carrying the buckets suspended on a pole on the day the soldiers, disguised as merchants, come by its top and take a rest in a grove as the weather is terribly hot.  Meanwhile Chao Gai and his gang, posing as date traders, are already there pretending too to have a respite in their journey. Happy to see a wine seller, the escorts think they could have some refreshment. But their leader Yang Zhi forbids them stressing caution.

Chao Gai and his gang pretend to approach Bai to buy a bucket of wine. Bai initially refuses to sell them any in a sham act to further disarm the escorts.  Anyway, his wine is not yet spiked when he relents and allows them to take one bucket. Then Liu Tang pretends to steal a free scoop from the other. Bai Sheng chases after him when Wu Yong also tries to pinch a scoop. Bai snatches the scoop in Wu's hand and pours the wine, now laced with drug, back into the bucket. As the "date traders" are all right unaffected by the content in both buckets, Yang Zhi grudgingly gives in to his men's plea and allows them to buy the remaining wine. He himself also has some sips. Bai Sheng leaves the scene once all his wine is consumed.

Soon Yang Zhi and his men feel dizzy and fall over numb in their limbs. The seven robbers cart away the valuables. Bai Sheng later receives his share of the loot.

Joining Liangshan
Grand Secretary Liang Shijie, who is also the governor of Daming prefecture, is mad over the loss of the valuables, which are his birthday gift to his father-in-law Cai Jing. He orders the prefect of Jizhou, where Yellow Mud Ridge is located, to quickly track down and arrest the robbers. The prefect assigns constable He Tao to investigate the case.

He Qing, He Tao's brother, has run into Cao Gai's group shortly before the hijack in an inn near Yellow Mud Ridge and was surprised to see the village headman posing as a trader. Later he also came across Bai Sheng carrying two buckets of wine. He feeds his brother the tips, who immediately takes his men to Bai‘s house. Bai's wife claims that her husband is ill. But He insists on a search and finds a bundle of valuables buried in the ground under Bai's bed. Bai is arrested with his wife and subjected to torture to make him name the other seven. Bai initially denies involvement but in the end breaks under torment.

Song Jiang, a clerk of Yuncheng's magistrate, is shocked when told by He Tao that Chao Gai has been identified as the mastermind of the Yellow Mud Ridge robbery. He rushes to Chao's house to alert him. Chao and his gang manage to flee and seek refuge in the bandit stronghold of Liangshan Marsh. After Chao is elected leader of Liangshan, replacing its original chief Wang Lun who was killed by Lin Chong, he sends men to bribe the prison guards at Jizhou to be lax in their watch over Bai Sheng. This enables Bai to slip out of jail. He joins Liangshan taking along his wife.

Campaigns and death
Bai Sheng is appointed as one of the scout leaders of Liangshan after the 108 Stars of Destiny came together in what is called the Grand Assembly. He participates in the campaigns against the Liao invaders and rebel forces in Song territory following amnesty from Emperor Huizong for Liangshan.

Bai Sheng dies of illness soon after the battle of Hangzhou in the campaign against Fang La.

References
 
 
 
 
 
 
 

72 Earthly Fiends
Fictional gamblers
Fictional characters from Shandong